Louis Klazinga (born 4 December 1985) is a Namibian cricketer.

After playing for Eldoraigne High School in Centurion, Gauteng, he first played for Namibia in October 2006 as a pace bowler and tail-end batsman, in the South African Airways Three-Day Challenge, making his debut against Limpopo. He took the wickets of Sammy Letsoalo, Jacques Pretorius and Sipho Mashele, but did not bat during the match, following captain Louis Burger's declaration after scoring a century. In his second match for Namibia, he took four wickets. Since then, he has been Namibia's regular opening bowler. After failing to qualify for the ICC World Twenty20 2016, at the age of 29, Klazinga announced his retirement from cricket, leaving a big hole in the weak and inexperienced Namibia Cricket Team.

He was named in the team of the tournament after the ICC Intercontinental Cup in 2007-08.

References

External links
Louis Klazinga at Cricket Archive
Louis Klazinga at Cricinfo

1985 births
Living people
Cricketers from Pretoria
Namibian cricketers